Upper Holloway is a district in the London Borough of Islington, London, centred on the upper part of Holloway Road and Junction Road. It is served by the Overground at Upper Holloway Station and the Northern Line at Archway Station.

History

Toponymy
The part of the Great North Road through north of the parish of Islington was known as the Holloway by 1307, a name later applied to the communities that formed along it. Upper Holloway is the original designation of the N19 postal district and the term is still used by the Royal Mail.

Urban development
Upper Holloway was one of several hamlets within the ancient parish of St Mary Islington. As the population of the parish was increasing, the Church of St John Upper Holloway was built to meet local need, using the provisions of the Church Building Act 1818. It was consecrated in 1828 and in 1830 a new ecclesiastical parish was created, beginning the subdivision of the parish of Islington for this purpose.

The area around Hornsey Road was traditionally known as "Tollington" and this name was used in the Domesday Book. This name has largely fallen out of use, but it remains as the name as an electoral ward on the local council and also of the parish of the Church of England in the area, and some local businesses still use the name in their name.

Media
The classic late Victorian comic novel Diary of a Nobody is set in Upper Holloway. The BBC's BBC Doomsday Project has some content for this area.

See also
 The Bomb Factory Art Foundation

References

Areas of London
Articles containing video clips